The Port of Shenzhen is a collective name of a number of ports along parts of the coastline of Shenzhen, Guangdong Province, China. These ports as a whole forms one of the busiest and fastest growing container ports in the world.

The port is home to 40 shipping companies who have launched around 130 international container routes. There are 560 ships on call at Shenzhen port on a monthly basis and also 21 feeder routes to other ports in the Pearl River Delta region. Shekou Passenger Terminal provides fast ferry services across the Pearl River Delta to Hong Kong, Macau and Zhuhai.

Geography
The Port of Shenzhen is spread along Shenzhen city’s 260 km coastline. It is separated by the New Territories and the Kowloon Peninsula of Hong Kong into two areas: the eastern port and the western port.

Shenzhen port's western port is located to the east of Lingdingyang in the Pearl River Estuary and consist of a deep water harbor with safe natural shelters. It is about 37.04 km from Hong Kong to the south and 111.12 km from Guangzhou to the north. As a result, the western port area is connected to the pearl river region which includes cities and counties along the river. The western port is also linked to On See dun waterway which allows trade to reach all the way to other ports.

The eastern port area is situated north of Dapeng Bay where the harbor is broad and calm and is claimed to be the best natural harbor in South China.

The second largest Chinese port is part of the 21st Century Maritime Silk Road that runs from the Chinese coast south to the tip of India via the Suez Canal to the Mediterranean, there to the Upper Adriatic region to the northern Italian hub of Trieste with its rail connections to Central Europe and the North Sea.

Infrastructure
The Port of Shenzhen consists of facilities in the following areas: Dachan Bay, Shekou, Chiwan, Mawan, Yantian, Dongjiaotou, Fuyong, Xiadong, Shayuchong and Neihe.

It has a total of 140 berths, including: 

Sisters ports 
 Port of Santa Cruz de Tenerife, Spain.

See also
Hong Kong-Shenzhen Western Corridor
Shekou Passenger Terminal

References

External links
Shenzhen Port Official Website
Bureau of Communications of Shenzhen Municipality (Ports Administration of Shenzhen Municipality)

Shenzhen, Port of
Transport in Shenzhen